Rineloricaria aequalicuspis is a species of catfish in the family Loricariidae. It is native to South America, where it is known only from Brazil. It is typically found in creeks and rivers of a variety of widths, where it occurs at various depths over substrates composed of rocks and stones. The species reaches 16.1 cm (6.3 inches) in standard length and is believed to be a facultative air-breather. Its specific name, aequalicuspis, refers to the shape of its teeth, which have two cusps of approximately equal sizes.

References 

Freshwater fish of Brazil
Fish described in 2001
Loricariidae